Finding Neverland is a musical with music and lyrics by Gary Barlow and Eliot Kennedy and a book by James Graham adapted from the 1998 play The Man Who Was Peter Pan by Allan Knee and its 2004 film version Finding Neverland. An early version of the musical made its world premiere at the Curve Theatre in Leicester in 2012 with a book by Allan Knee, music by Scott Frankel and lyrics by Michael Korie. A reworked version with the current writing team made its world premiere in 2014 at the American Repertory Theater in Cambridge, Massachusetts. Following completion of its Cambridge run, the production transferred to Broadway in March 2015.

After a 17-month Broadway run, Finding Neverland closed on 21 August 2016, and began a U.S. national tour the following month.

Background
On 6 February 2011, La Jolla Playhouse, California, announced that they would produce a new stage musical based on the film with the book by Allan Knee, score by Scott Frankel (music) and Michael Korie (lyrics), and directed and choreographed by Rob Ashford. A planned production at La Jolla Playhouse was not held. A developmental reading was held in New York on 31 March 2011, with Julian Ovenden, Kelli O'Hara, Tony Roberts, Mary Beth Peil, Michael Cumpsty, and Meredith Patterson, directed by Ashford.
The adaptation had its world premiere on 22 September 2012 at Curve in Leicester. Directed by Rob Ashford, it starred Julian Ovenden as J.M Barrie and West End actress Rosalie Craig as Sylvia Llewelyn Davies.

On 4 September 2013, it was announced that producer Harvey Weinstein had hired Barry Weissler as executive producer. They planned on opening a revised version of the musical at the American Repertory Theater (ART), Cambridge, Massachusetts in 2014. The revised musical had a new creative team, with Diane Paulus as director, a new book by James Graham, and 22 songs by Gary Barlow and Eliot Kennedy, with a few songs from the original composers. A private reading was held in September 2013 with Brian d’Arcy James as Barrie and Jason Alexander as the "nagging theater producer". On 27 February 2014, a further developmental workshop was announced for March with Matthew Morrison as Barrie.

Productions
The revised production ran at the ART from 23 July 2014 to 28 September 2014, with songs by six-time Ivor Novello Award winner Gary Barlow and Eliot Kennedy, the book by James Graham and choreography by Mia Michaels; ART artistic director Diane Paulus is the director. The full cast and creative team was announced on 2 June 2014, with Jeremy Jordan as Barrie and Laura Michelle Kelly as Sylvia Llewelyn Davies featured. The cast also includes Michael McGrath as Charles Frohman/Captain Hook, Carolee Carmello as Madame du Maurier, Jeanna de Waal as Mary Barrie, Aidan Gemme as Peter, Alex Dreier as Michael, Sawyer Nunes as George and Hayden Signoretti as Jack. Roger Bart who was originally announced for the character of Charles Frohman was replaced by Michael McGrath.

Jennifer Hudson debuted the song "Neverland", from the musical, at the 68th Tony Awards on 8 June 2014.

The ART production directed by Diane Paulus moved to Broadway at the Lunt-Fontanne Theatre in March 2015. On 10 November 2014, it was announced that Matthew Morrison would take Jordan's place in the portrayal of J. M. Barrie in the Broadway production. Kelsey Grammer starred as Charles Frohman and Laura Michelle Kelly reprised the role of Sylvia Llewelyn Davies. Previews began 15 March 2015, with the official opening on 15 April. The production did not receive any Tony Award nominations. The Broadway production closed on 21 August 2016 after 565 performances. In 2017, as an offshoot of investigations into and reporting about Weinstein's many sexual abuse allegations, several news sources also reported that a significant amount of money that Weinstein ostensibly raised for the AIDS charity amfAR was instead allegedly funneled into the American Repertory Theater and the production budget for Finding Neverland. 

In early 2016 it was announced that Finding Neverland would open in London in 2017, starring Alfie Boe as J.M. Barrie. The rest of the cast has not been announced. On 15 May 2016, Gary Barlow performed the song "Something About This Night" from the musical for the Queen's 90th birthday celebration, hosted by Ant & Dec. Guest starring was Katherine Jenkins and Dame Shirley Bassey.

The US national tour began in Buffalo, New York on 7 October 2016, prior to the official opening on 11 October. The tour was directed by Diane Paulus and featured Kevin Kern as J.M. Barrie, Christine Dwyer as Sylvia Llewelyn Davies, Tom Hewitt as Frohman/Hook, Crystal Kellogg, Joanna Glushak, Jordan Cole, Finn Faulconer, Tyler Patrick Hennessy, Ben Krieger, Eli Tokash and Mitchell Wray.

Characters
 James Matthew Barrie: The creator of Peter Pan, a Scottish playwright who still has a child inside of him.
 Sylvia Llewelyn Davies: a widow with four children whose family inspires Barrie to write Peter Pan.
 Mary Barrie: James' unhappy wife.
 Mrs. du Maurier: Sylvia's strict mother who despises Barrie.
 Charles Frohman: Barrie's friend and the director/producer of the Acting Company that Barrie writes for.
 Captain James Hook: The classic villain from Peter Pan, comes to Barrie in a vision to convince him to add a villain to his show. Played by the same actor as Frohman.
 Peter Llewelyn Davies: One of Sylvia's sons. Loves reading and develops a strong relationship with Barrie.
 Michael Llewelyn Davies: One of Sylvia's sons.
 Jack Llewelyn Davies: One of Sylvia's sons.
 George Llewelyn Davies: One of Sylvia's sons.
 Lord Canaan: A wealthy and pompous man who Frohman tries to get as a fellow producer for the play, ends up with Mary.
 Mr. Cromer: A grumpy yet lovable member of the acting troupe. Plays Michael in Peter Pan.
 Mr. Henshaw: A vain yet friendly member of the acting troupe. Plays Nana in Peter Pan.
 Elliott: Frohman's eager assistant.
 Miss Basset: A member of the acting troupe. Plays Nibs in Peter Pan. 
 Miss Jones: A member of the acting troupe. Plays Tootles in Peter Pan.
 Mr. Turpin: A member of the acting troupe. Plays Captain Hook in Peter Pan.
 Peter Pan: The titular character of the play, takes Sylvia to Neverland towards the end of the show.
 Wendy (Acting Troupe): The eldest Darling child in the show within a show.
 Albert: Mary's butler.
 Emily: Mary's head maid.
 Porthos: Barrie's dog.
 The Acting Troupe, Servants, Londoners, Pirates, Indians, Lost Boys

Casts
Note: Below are the principal casts of all professional major productions. some roles are portrayed by the same actors.

Notes 
 In the Leicester production, Lord Cannan was called Lord Griffin and Charles Blount was called Maximilian Blunt.  Cut characters include PG Wodehouse (Norman Bowman), Mermaid (Ashley Hale), Scheherazade (Frankie Jenna), Mother (Julia Jupp), Arthur Conan Doyle (Martin Ledwith), Sally (Zoe Rainey), GK Chesterton (Gary Watson), Jerome K. Jerome (Stephen Webb), and David (James Scudamore).

Notable Broadway replacements 
 Charles Frohman/Captain Hook: Anthony Warlow, Terrence Mann, Kelsey Grammer, Marc Kudisch
 J.M. Barrie: Tony Yazbeck, Alfie Boe, Kevin Kern (u/s)
 Mrs. du Maurier: Sandy Duncan, Sally Ann Triplett

Musical numbers

Cambridge

 Act I
 "Anywhere But Here" – J. M. Barrie
 "Better" – Charles Frohman, J. M. Barrie and the Acting Troupe
 "Rearranging the Furniture" – Mary Barrie 
 "Believe" – J. M. Barrie, Sylvia Llewelyn Davies, Boys and Ensemble 
 "All That Matters" – Sylvia and Mrs. du Maurier
 "We Own the Night (The Dinner Party)" – Mary, Mrs. du Maurier, Lord Cannan, Frohman, Sylvia, J. M. Barrie, Boys, Ensemble
 "Sylvia's Lullaby" – Sylvia
 "Neverland" – J. M. Barrie
 "Circus of Your Mind" – Frohman, Mary, Mrs. du Maurier and Ensemble
 "Hook" – Captain Hook, Barrie, Pirates
 "Stronger" – J. M. Barrie, Captain Hook, Pirates, and Ensemble

 Act II
 "The World is Upside Down" – J. M. Barrie, Frohman and the Acting Troupe
 "Play" – Frohman, Sylvia and the Acting Troupe
 "What You Mean to Me" – J. M. Barrie and Sylvia
 "We're All Made of Stars" – the Llewelyn Davies Boys
 "When Your Feet Don't Touch the Ground" – J. M. Barrie and Peter
 "Something About This Night" – Mr. Cromer, Miss Potter, Mr. Turpin, Elliot, Frohman, JM Barrie, Peter, Ensemble
 "Neverland" (Reprise) – J. M. Barrie, Sylvia, Mrs. du Maurier, Boys and the Acting Troupe
 "Finale (All That Matters)" – Mrs. du Maurier, J. M. Barrie, Boys, Company

Broadway

 Act I
 "If the World Turned Upside Down" – J. M. Barrie
 "All of London is Here Tonight" – Charles Frohman, J. M. Barrie, Mary and Company
 "The Pirates of Kensington" – George, Jack, Michael and Peter
 "Believe" – J. M. Barrie, Sylvia Llewelyn Davies, Boys and Ensemble 
 "The Dinner Party" – Mary, Mrs. Du Maurier, Lord Cannan, Frohman, Barrie, Sylvia, Boys and Servants
 "We Own the Night" – Peter, Barrie, Sylvia, Boys, Ensemble
 "All That Matters" – Sylvia 
 "The Pirates of Kensington" (Reprise) – George, Peter, Jack and Michael       
 "Sylvia's Lullaby" – Sylvia Llewelyn Davies
 "Neverland" – J. M. Barrie and Sylvia
 "Circus of Your Mind" – Frohman, Mary, Mrs. du Maurier and Ensemble
 "Live by the Hook" – Captain Hook, Barrie and Pirates
 "Stronger" – J. M. Barrie, Captain Hook, Pirates and Ensemble

 Act II
 "The World is Upside Down" – J. M. Barrie, Frohman and the Acting Troupe
 "What You Mean to Me" – J. M. Barrie and Sylvia
 "Play" – Frohman, Sylvia, Cromer, Henshaw, Miss Bassett, Turpin, Miss Jones, Elliott, Barrie, and the Acting Troupe
 "We're All Made of Stars" – the Llewelyn Davies Boys
 "When Your Feet Don't Touch the Ground" – J. M. Barrie and Peter
 "Something About This Night" – Frohman, Elliott, the Acting Troupe, J. M. Barrie and Peter
 "Neverland" (Reprise) – J. M. Barrie, Sylvia, Mrs. du Maurier, Boys and the Acting Troupe
 "Finale (When Your Feet Don't Touch the Ground)" – Mrs. du Maurier, J. M. Barrie and Ensemble

National Tour

Act I
 "Welcome to London" - Barrie, Ensemble
 "My Imagination" - J.M. Barrie
 "Believe" – J. M. Barrie, Sylvia Llewelyn Davies, Boys and Ensemble
 "The Dinner Party" – Mary, Mrs. Du Maurier, Lord Cannan, Frohman, Barrie, Sylvia, Boys and Servants
 "We Own the Night" – Mary, Mrs. du Maurier, Lord Cannan, Frohman, Sylvia, Barrie, Boys and Servants
 "All That Matters" – Sylvia
 "We Own the Night" (Reprise) – George, Peter, Jack and Michael
 "Sylvia's Lullaby" – Sylvia Llewelyn Davies
 "Neverland" – J. M. Barrie and Sylvia
 "Circus of Your Mind" (Part 1) - Charles Frohman
 "Circus of Your Mind" (Part 2) - Mary Barrie
 "Circus of Your Mind" (Part 3) - Mrs. du Maurier
 "Circus of Your Mind" (Part 4) – Frohman, Mary, Mrs. du Maurier and Ensemble
 "Stronger" (Part 1) – J. M. Barrie, Captain Hook and Ensemble
 "Live by the Hook" – Captain Hook, Barrie, Pirates and Ensemble
 "Stronger" (Part 2) – J. M. Barrie, Captain Hook, Pirates and Ensemble

Act II
 "The World is Upside Down" – J. M. Barrie, Frohman and the Acting Troupe
 "What You Mean to Me" – J. M. Barrie and Sylvia
 "Play" – Frohman, Sylvia, Cromer, Henshaw, Barrie, and the Acting Troupe
 "We're All Made of Stars" – the Llewelyn Davies Boys
 "When Your Feet Don't Touch the Ground" – J. M. Barrie and Peter
 "Something About This Night" (Part 1) – Frohman, the Acting Troupe, J. M. Barrie and Peter
 "Something About This Night" (Part 2) – Frohman, the Acting Troupe, J. M. Barrie and Peter
 "Neverland" (Reprise) – J. M. Barrie, Sylvia, Mrs. du Maurier, Boys and the Acting Troupe
 "Finale (Believe)" – Mrs. du Maurier, J. M. Barrie, Boys, and Ensemble

Recordings
On 9 June 2015 Finding Neverland The Album (Songs From The Broadway Musical) was released, featuring covers of the musical's songs by popular artists such as Zendaya, Kiesza, Nick Jonas, Ellie Goulding, Paloma Faith, Jennifer Lopez, Trey Songz, Christina Aguilera, Jon Bon Jovi, Pentatonix, John Legend, Christina Perri, and Goo Goo Dolls. It debuted at number 114 on the US Billboard 200 and number one on the Billboard Cast Albums chart.

The original Broadway cast recording of Finding Neverland was released on 23 June 2015. It debuted at number 84 on the US Billboard 200 and number one on the Billboard Cast Albums chart.

Awards and nominations

Original Broadway production

References

External links

2012 musicals
2014 musicals
Musicals based on films
Musicals based on multiple works
Cultural depictions of J. M. Barrie
British musicals
Broadway musicals
Plays by James Graham
Musicals set in London